Asaduzzaman Khan (1916 – 21 January 1992) was a Bangladeshi politician and government minister.

Early life
Khan was born in 1916 in Kishoreganj, East Bengal, British Raj. He finished law degree from the University of Dhaka and M.A. in history from there.

Career
In 1941, Khan joined the Bengal Civil Service, judicial branch. He was also a part-time lecturer of University of Dhaka's Law Department and a lawyer in the High Court. In 1965, he was elected to the East Pakistan Provincial Assembly in 1965. He served as the leader of the opposition in the assembly 1967 and joined Awami League in 1969. He served as the minister of jute in the cabinet of Sheikh Mujibur Rahman in 1975 and later the Minister of Port, Navigation, and Inland Water Transport in the Khondaker Mostaq Ahmad cabinet. In 1979, he was elected head of the Awami League and served as the leader of the opposition.

Death
Khan died on 21 January 1992 in Dhaka, Bangladesh.

References

1916 births
1992 deaths
Awami League politicians
1st Jatiya Sangsad members
2nd Jatiya Sangsad members
Leaders of the Opposition (Bangladesh)

University of Dhaka alumni